Fr. Edvard Kovač (born 1950) is a Slovenian theologian, philosopher and author. He is a member of the Order of Friars Minor and professor at the University of Ljubljana Theological Faculty and the Catholic University of Toulouse. 

Kovač is author of numerous published works and has twice been awarded the French Ordre du Mérite. In 2000 he received the Rožanc Award (the most prestigious Slovenian award for essayism) for his collection of essays Oddaljena bližina (The Distant Proximity). 

His thought has been influenced by the Jewish theologians Emmanuel Levinas and Martin Buber, the Christian existentialism of Gabriel Marcel and by the French Nouvelle Théologie.

Published works
 Nietzschejeva tragičnost (The Tragedy of Nietzsche), 1980
 Slovenska nacionalna zavest (Slovene National Conscience), 1992 (with Franc Rode)
 Modrost o ljubezni (Wisdom on Love), 1992
 Oddaljena bližina (The Distant Proximity), 2000

References

Slovenian writers
Slovenian theologians
Living people
1950 births
Slovenian Friars Minor
20th-century Slovenian philosophers
Academic staff of the University of Ljubljana
Academic staff of the University of Toulouse
21st-century Slovenian philosophers